Zhang Meng (born April 1975 in Tieling, China) is a Chinese director and screenwriter. He graduated from the Chinese Central Academy of Drama. In 2007, he made his directorial debut with Lucky Dog (Erduo Da You Fu). His first documentary was called Mr. Zhang and His Dog (2008). The Piano in a Factory (Gang de qin) won the Grand Jury Prize at the Miami International Film Festival in 2011 and the award for best actor, for Wang Qian-Yuan, at the 23rd Tokyo International Film Festival.

Filmography

Released films/television series

References

External links

Film directors from Liaoning
Living people
1975 births
People from Tieling
Central Academy of Drama alumni
Chinese film directors